Lachen-Mangan Assembly constituency is one of the 32 assembly constituencies of Sikkim, a north east state of India. This constituency falls under Sikkim Lok Sabha constituency.

This constituency is reserved for members of the Bhutia-Lepcha community.

Members of Legislative Assembly
 2009: Tshering Wangdi Lepcha, Sikkim Democratic Front
 2014: Tshering Wangdi Lepcha, Sikkim Krantikari Morcha

Election results

2019

See also
 Sikkim Lok Sabha constituency
 North Sikkim district

References

Assembly constituencies of Sikkim
Mangan district